Andrea Torresani (c. 1727–1760) was an Italian painter of the Baroque period, active in his native city of Brescia, Milan,  and Venice.

Died at age 33 years from a stroke. He was said to have trained with a mediocre painter by the name of Antonio Aureggio in Brescia. Moved to Venice, where he became known as an excellent painter of landscapes, portraits, and draughtsman. He is known to have penned landscapes for Zaccharia Sagredo and Pietro Guarienti.

An engraver of the same name was active in Venice 1480-1520.

References

1720s births
1760 deaths
People from Brescia
Italian draughtsmen
18th-century Italian painters
Italian male painters
Painters from Venice
Painters from Brescia
Italian Baroque painters
Italian landscape painters
18th-century Italian male artists